Silhouettes is the debut studio album by British indie band Aquilo. It was released on 27 January 2017 through Island Records. The album includes songs from previous extended play releases, including "Human", "You Won't Know Where You Stand", "I Gave It All", "Never Seen You Get So Low" and "Waiting". The lead single from the album, entitled "Sorry", was released on 10 November 2016.

Critical reception

Silhouettes received positive reviews from music critics. At Metacritic, which assigns a normalised rating out of 100 to reviews from mainstream critics, the album received an average score of 75, based on five professional reviews. Clash writer Shannon Cotton said that "crafted to perfection, ‘Silhouettes’ is outstanding in its audible beauty". Bernadette McNulty of The Guardian gave the album three stars out of five, calling it "melancholy but slit", and saying that "vocalist Tom Higham deploys his requisite falsetto sparingly, but the surfeit of emotion and tranquillity [sic] flattens their musical landscape". Anna Alger from Exclaim! noted that "Aquilo captivate most when they vary the tempo and instrumentation within their songs, and they do it often enough to make Silhouettes a strong debut overall". Will Fisher wrote a positive review for The VLM, saying that "Aquilo occasionally fall foul to the cliches that saturate this genre", but "as a debut however, Silhouettes is a refreshing introduction to a compelling new band who just have the occasional beige moment".

Another positive review was written by Jessie Morris of Pigeons & Planes, who compared Silhouettes' music to the sound of artists like The xx, Sigur Rós and Radiohead, praising the "well-established electronics vein windswept and tender pop bleeding with a broken heart". A positive review came by Hannah Mylrea from the magazine The 405: "Silhouettes is a journey through the duo’s expansive sound. Although sometimes the journey gets bumpy, and Aquilo lose their way to sleepy filler, they always manage to find their way back to the dreamy, lush pop and rich electronic tapestries that makes part of this record such a triumph".
Mixmag crew gave to the album an average of eight out of ten and wrote that "Lancaster duo Ben Fletcher and Tom Higham create spellbinding and atmospheric pop that’s perfect for wintry church concerts. Like a warm embrace on an icy morning, the pair's captivating harmonies come together effortlessly on debut album ‘Silhouette’".

Accolades

Track listing

Note
  signifies an additional producer.

Charts

Weekly charts

References

2017 debut albums
Aquilo (band) albums
Island Records albums